The 1996–97 New York Rangers season was the franchise's 71st season. The highlight of the season was that it was Wayne Gretzky's first season in New York.

The Rangers qualified for the playoffs as the fifth seed in the Eastern Conference, and advanced all the way to the Eastern Conference Finals, where they were defeated by the Philadelphia Flyers. This marked the last playoff appearance for the Rangers until the 2005–06 season.

Regular season
The Rangers had the fewest power-play opportunities during the regular season (287), but the best power-play percentage (21.95%).

Final standings

Schedule and results

|- align="center" bgcolor="white"
| 1 || 5 || @ Boston Bruins || 4 - 4 OT || 0-0-1
|- align="center" bgcolor="#FFBBBB"
| 2 || 6 || Florida Panthers || 5 - 2 || 0-1-1
|- align="center" bgcolor="white"
| 3 || 8 || @ Florida Panthers || 1 - 1 OT || 0-1-2
|- align="center" bgcolor="#FFBBBB"
| 4 || 10 || Dallas Stars || 2 - 1 || 0-2-2
|- align="center" bgcolor="#FFBBBB"
| 5 || 12 || @ Montreal Canadiens || 5 - 2 || 0-3-2
|- align="center" bgcolor="#CCFFCC"
| 6 || 14 || Calgary Flames || 5 - 4 || 1-3-2
|- align="center" bgcolor="#CCFFCC"
| 7 || 16 || Pittsburgh Penguins || 8 - 1 || 2-3-2
|- align="center" bgcolor="#CCFFCC"
| 8 || 18 || St. Louis Blues || 2 - 1 || 3-3-2
|- align="center" bgcolor="#FFBBBB"
| 9 || 20 || @ Tampa Bay Lightning || 5 - 2 || 3-4-2
|- align="center" bgcolor="#FFBBBB"
| 10 || 23 || Washington Capitals || 3 - 2 || 3-5-2
|- align="center" bgcolor="#FFBBBB"
| 11 || 25 || @ Florida Panthers || 6 - 4 || 3-6-2
|- align="center" bgcolor="#CCFFCC"
| 12 || 27 || Buffalo Sabres || 6 - 4 || 4-6-2
|- align="center" bgcolor="white"
| 13 || 29 || Florida Panthers || 1 - 1 OT || 4-6-3
|- align="center" bgcolor="#CCFFCC"
| 14 || 30 || @ New Jersey Devils || 6 - 1 || 5-6-3
|-

|- align="center" bgcolor="#CCFFCC"
| 15 || 2 || @ Boston Bruins || 5 - 2 || 6-6-3
|- align="center" bgcolor="#FFBBBB"
| 16 || 4 || Tampa Bay Lightning || 5 - 3 || 6-7-3
|- align="center" bgcolor="white"
| 17 || 6 || @ New York Islanders || 1 - 1 OT || 6-7-4
|- align="center" bgcolor="#FFBBBB"
| 18 || 9 || @ Washington Capitals || 3 - 2 || 6-8-4
|- align="center" bgcolor="#FFBBBB"
| 19 || 11 || Vancouver Canucks || 3 - 2 || 6-9-4
|- align="center" bgcolor="#FFBBBB"
| 20 || 13 || Philadelphia Flyers || 2 - 1 || 6-10-4
|- align="center" bgcolor="#CCFFCC"
| 21 || 16 || @ Pittsburgh Penguins || 8 - 3 || 7-10-4
|- align="center" bgcolor="#FFBBBB"
| 22 || 18 || @ Calgary Flames || 5 - 3 || 7-11-4
|- align="center" bgcolor="#FFBBBB"
| 23 || 21 || @ Edmonton Oilers || 3 - 2 || 7-12-4
|- align="center" bgcolor="#FFBBBB"
| 24 || 23 || @ Vancouver Canucks || 5 - 3 || 7-13-4
|- align="center" bgcolor="#CCFFCC"
| 25 || 26 || @ Phoenix Coyotes || 3 - 1 || 8-13-4
|- align="center" bgcolor="#CCFFCC"
| 26 || 27 || @ Colorado Avalanche || 5 - 2 || 9-13-4
|-

|- align="center" bgcolor="#CCFFCC"
| 27 || 1 || Montreal Canadiens || 6 - 2 || 10-13-4
|- align="center" bgcolor="white"
| 28 || 4 || Philadelphia Flyers || 1 - 1 OT || 10-13-5
|- align="center" bgcolor="#CCFFCC"
| 29 || 6 || Toronto Maple Leafs || 6 - 5 || 11-13-5
|- align="center" bgcolor="#CCFFCC"
| 30 || 7 || @ Toronto Maple Leafs || 4 - 0 || 12-13-5
|- align="center" bgcolor="#CCFFCC"
| 31 || 9 || Phoenix Coyotes || 5 - 2 || 13-13-5
|- align="center" bgcolor="#FFBBBB"
| 32 || 11 || New York Islanders || 5 - 3 || 13-14-5
|- align="center" bgcolor="#CCFFCC"
| 33 || 13 || @ Buffalo Sabres || 3 - 0 || 14-14-5
|- align="center" bgcolor="#CCFFCC"
| 34 || 16 || Hartford Whalers || 5 - 2 || 15-14-5
|- align="center" bgcolor="#CCFFCC"
| 35 || 18 || Los Angeles Kings || 4 - 0 || 16-14-5
|- align="center" bgcolor="#CCFFCC"
| 36 || 21 || @ Montreal Canadiens || 3 - 2 OT || 17-14-5
|- align="center" bgcolor="#CCFFCC"
| 37 || 22 || Florida Panthers || 7 - 3 || 18-14-5
|- align="center" bgcolor="#FFBBBB"
| 38 || 26 || @ Ottawa Senators || 5 - 2 || 18-15-5
|- align="center" bgcolor="#CCFFCC"
| 39 || 27 || Mighty Ducks of Anaheim || 3 - 2 || 19-15-5
|- align="center" bgcolor="#CCFFCC"
| 40 || 30 || @ Dallas Stars || 3 - 2 || 20-15-5
|- align="center" bgcolor="#FFBBBB"
| 41 || 31 || @ Tampa Bay Lightning || 4 - 2 || 20-16-5
|-

|- align="center" bgcolor="#CCFFCC"
| 42 || 2 || New York Islanders || 4 - 3 || 21-16-5
|- align="center" bgcolor="#CCFFCC"
| 43 || 4 || Ottawa Senators || 6 - 4 || 22-16-5
|- align="center" bgcolor="white"
| 44 || 6 || Colorado Avalanche || 2 - 2 OT || 22-16-6
|- align="center" bgcolor="#FFBBBB"
| 45 || 8 || Tampa Bay Lightning || 4 - 3 || 22-17-6
|- align="center" bgcolor="#FFBBBB"
| 46 || 9 || @ Washington Capitals || 2 - 0 || 22-18-6
|- align="center" bgcolor="#CCFFCC"
| 47 || 12 || New Jersey Devils || 3 - 0 || 23-18-6
|- align="center" bgcolor="#FFBBBB"
| 48 || 13 || New York Islanders || 4 - 2 || 23-19-6
|- align="center" bgcolor="white"
| 49 || 21 || Edmonton Oilers || 4 - 4 OT || 23-19-7
|- align="center" bgcolor="#CCFFCC"
| 50 || 22 || @ Washington Capitals || 5 - 3 || 24-19-7
|- align="center" bgcolor="#CCFFCC"
| 51 || 25 || @ Pittsburgh Penguins || 7 - 4 || 25-19-7
|- align="center" bgcolor="#FFBBBB"
| 52 || 27 || Chicago Blackhawks || 2 - 1 || 25-20-7
|-

|- align="center" bgcolor="#CCFFCC"
| 53 || 1 || @ Philadelphia Flyers || 4 - 2 || 26-20-7
|- align="center" bgcolor="#FFBBBB"
| 54 || 2 || Boston Bruins || 3 - 2 || 26-21-7
|- align="center" bgcolor="#CCFFCC"
| 55 || 5 || Hartford Whalers || 5 - 2 || 27-21-7
|- align="center" bgcolor="#CCFFCC"
| 56 || 8 || @ New York Islanders || 5 - 2 || 28-21-7
|- align="center" bgcolor="#FFBBBB"
| 57 || 9 || @ Florida Panthers || 4 - 3 || 28-22-7
|- align="center" bgcolor="#FFBBBB"
| 58 || 13 || @ St. Louis Blues || 4 - 1 || 28-23-7
|- align="center" bgcolor="#FFBBBB"
| 59 || 15 || @ Chicago Blackhawks || 2 - 0 || 28-24-7
|- align="center" bgcolor="white"
| 60 || 17 || New Jersey Devils || 2 - 2 OT || 28-24-8
|- align="center" bgcolor="white"
| 61 || 19 || @ New Jersey Devils || 1 - 1 OT || 28-24-9
|- align="center" bgcolor="#FFBBBB"
| 62 || 21 || @ Hartford Whalers || 7 - 2 || 28-25-9
|- align="center" bgcolor="#FFBBBB"
| 63 || 23 || @ Philadelphia Flyers || 2 - 1 || 28-26-9
|-

|- align="center" bgcolor="#FFBBBB"
| 64 || 1 || @ Detroit Red Wings || 3 - 0 || 28-27-9
|- align="center" bgcolor="#CCFFCC"
| 65 || 3 || San Jose Sharks || 5 - 4 OT || 29-27-9
|- align="center" bgcolor="#CCFFCC"
| 66 || 6 || @ Los Angeles Kings || 6 - 2 || 30-27-9
|- align="center" bgcolor="#FFBBBB"
| 67 || 7 || @ Mighty Ducks of Anaheim || 5 - 2 || 30-28-9
|- align="center" bgcolor="#CCFFCC"
| 68 || 9 || @ San Jose Sharks || 2 - 1 || 31-28-9
|- align="center" bgcolor="#CCFFCC"
| 69 || 12 || Washington Capitals || 3 - 2 || 32-28-9
|- align="center" bgcolor="#CCFFCC"
| 70 || 14 || @ Ottawa Senators || 4 - 3 OT || 33-28-9
|- align="center" bgcolor="#FFBBBB"
| 71 || 17 || Ottawa Senators || 4 - 3 || 33-29-9
|- align="center" bgcolor="#FFBBBB"
| 72 || 19 || Montreal Canadiens || 5 - 4 || 33-30-9
|- align="center" bgcolor="#CCFFCC"
| 73 || 21 || Detroit Red Wings || 3 - 1 || 34-30-9
|- align="center" bgcolor="#CCFFCC"
| 74 || 24 || Pittsburgh Penguins || 3 - 0 || 35-30-9
|- align="center" bgcolor="#FFBBBB"
| 75 || 27 || @ New Jersey Devils || 4 - 0 || 35-31-9
|- align="center" bgcolor="#FFBBBB"
| 76 || 29 || @ Hartford Whalers || 2 - 1 || 35-32-9
|-

|- align="center" bgcolor="white"
| 77 || 1 || Buffalo Sabres || 1 - 1 OT || 35-32-10
|- align="center" bgcolor="#CCFFCC"
| 78 || 3 || Boston Bruins || 5 - 4 || 36-32-10
|- align="center" bgcolor="#FFBBBB"
| 79 || 4 || @ Buffalo Sabres || 5 - 1 || 36-33-10
|- align="center" bgcolor="#CCFFCC"
| 80 || 7 || Philadelphia Flyers || 3 - 2 || 37-33-10
|- align="center" bgcolor="#CCFFCC"
| 81 || 10 || @ Philadelphia Flyers || 6 - 3 || 38-33-10
|- align="center" bgcolor="#FFBBBB"
| 82 || 11 || Tampa Bay Lightning || 4 - 2 || 38-34-10
|-

Playoffs

Key:  Win  Loss

Player statistics
Skaters

Goaltenders

†Denotes player spent time with another team before joining Rangers. Stats reflect time with Rangers only.
‡Traded mid-season. Stats reflect time with Rangers only.

Awards and records
 James Norris Memorial Trophy: Brian Leetch

Draft picks
New York's picks at the 1996 NHL Entry Draft in St. Louis, Missouri at the Kiel Center.

References

External links
 Rangers on Hockey Database

New York Rangers seasons
New York Rangers
New York Rangers
New York Rangers
New York Rangers
1990s in Manhattan
Madison Square Garden